Camarillo is a city in Ventura County in the U.S. state of California. 

Camarillo may also refer to:

People
Juan Camarillo Jr. (1867–1936), Californio landowner and philanthropist, co-founder of Camarillo
Adolfo Camarillo (1864–1958), his brother, Californio ranchero and co-founder of Camarillo, California
Ángel Camarillo (born 1959), Spanish cyclist
Angelina (American singer) (Angelina Camarillo Ramos, born 1976), American singer
Dolores Camarillo (1910–1988), Mexican actress
Greg Camarillo (born 1982), American footballer
Isidro Camarillo Zavala (born 1951), Mexican politician
María Enriqueta Camarillo (1872–1968), Mexican poet and author
Rich Camarillo (born 1959), American footballer
Rubén Camarillo Ortega (born 1961), Mexican politician
Sharon Camarillo (fl. 2006), Californian rodeo champion

Other uses
5653 Camarillo, an asteroid

See also

 Camarilla (disambiguation)
 Camarillo White Horse, a rare horse breed 
 Terry Scott Taylor, Californian musician known as Camarillo Eddy